The 1900–01 season Tottenham Hotspur competed in the Southern Football League where they finished in 5th place. They also entered the Western League for the first time were they finished 3rd. This was the season in which Tottenham, classed as a non-league club at the time went on to win the FA Cup and still are the only non-league winners of the competition to date. The club reached the final where they played Sheffield United. The first match was played at Crystal Palace in London which finished in a 2–2 draw. The reply was moved to Bolton and Spurs won the game 3–1.

Squad

Transfers

In

Out

Competitions

Southern Football League

Table

Results

Western League

In Tottenham's first outing in the Western League the team went on an unbeaten 11 game run, then on 27 March 1901 they sent their reserve team to play Bristol City in the league as the first team was to play Reading in the FA Cup the following day. A further two losses away against Portsmouth and Bristol Rovers, resulted in Tottenham finishing 3rd in the table.

Table

Results

FA Cup

Sheffield United where considered the favourites with nine English internationals on their team. In the first game that finished 2–2 Sheffield were considered lucky as their second goal was classed as controversial. The linesman had indicated it should be a corner after George Clawley saved a shot from Walter Bennett however the referee over-ruled him for and pointed to the centre circle indicating it had been a goal. The reply which both teams wanted to be played at Villa Park, was instead played at Bolton where Tottenham won 3–1.

Results

References

Tottenham Hotspur F.C. seasons
English football clubs 1900–01 season